Castro Marim is a freguesia (parish) in Castro Marim Municipality (Algarve, Portugal). The population in 2011 was 3,267, in an area of 79.35 km².

Main sites
Castro Marim Castle
São Sebastião Fort

References

External links
 Castro Marim parish data included in the Castro Marim municipality website

Freguesias of Castro Marim